The Confederate Rangers is a role-playing game published by SoLar-Way Games in 1989.

Description
The Confederate Rangers is a near-future science fiction system set in an alternate America where the government is so corrupt that 13 southern states secede and form a new Confederacy. The heroes are Confederate Rangers, high-tech lawmen with old-time values.

Publication history
The Confederate Rangers was published by SoLar-Way Games in 1989.

Reception

References

Role-playing games introduced in 1989
Science fiction role-playing games